Mark Girouard  (7 October 1931 – 16 August 2022) was a British architectural historian. He was an authority on the country house, and Elizabethan and Victorian architecture.

Life and career

Girouard was born on 7 October 1931. He was educated at Ampleforth College, read Classics at Christ Church, Oxford, and then worked for the magazine Country Life from about 1958 until 1967, firstly as a writer on architecture and then, from 1964, as its architectural editor. He was Slade Professor of Fine Art from 1975 to 1976 and elected a Fellow of the Society of Antiquaries of London in 1987. Girouard was elected a Fellow of the Royal Society of Literature in 2011. He was on the board of trustees of The Architecture Foundation from 1992 to 1999 and a founder, and the first chairman, of the Spitalfields Historic Buildings Trust. He was the grandson of Henry Beresford, 6th Marquess of Waterford through his mother, Lady Blanche Girouard.

His Life in the English Country House won the Duff Cooper Memorial Prize for 1978, and the WH Smith Literary Award in 1979.

National Life Stories conducted an oral history interview (C467/92) with Girouard in 2009 for its Architects Lives' collection held by the British Library.

Photographs by Girouard are held in the Conway Library of Art and Architecture at the Courtauld Institute of Art, and are currently being digitised.

Personal life

Girouard was married to the artist Dorothy Girouard and they lived in Notting Hill Gate, London. Their daughter is the writer Blanche Girouard. Girouard died on 16 August 2022, at the age of 90.

Girouard wrote of his ancestral connection to Saul Solomon, a pioneer liberal politician and businessman in Cape Colony, and his wife Georgiana Solomon, a social activist and suffragette. Girouard was descended from Saul's brother Edward, born in 1820 in Saint Helena, who spent 18 years working with the Griquas and Basutos for the London Missionary Society.

Bibliography 

Montacute House, Somerset (1964)
Robert Smythson and the Architecture of the Elizabethan Era (1966)
The Victorian Country House (1971)
Victorian Pubs (1975)
Hardwick Hall (1976)
Sweetness and Light: The "Queen Anne" Movement, 1860–1900 (1977)
Life in the English Country House: A Social and Architectural History (1978)
Historic Houses of Britain (1979)
Alfred Waterhouse and the Natural History Museum (1981), 
The Return to Camelot: Chivalry and the English Gentleman (1981)
Robert Smythson and the Elizabethan Country House (1983)
Cities and People: A Social and Architectural History (1985)
A Country House Companion (1987) editor
The English Town: A History of Urban Life (1990)
Town and Country (1992)
Windsor: The Most Romantic Castle (1993)
Big Jim: The Life and Work of James Stirling (1998) Chatto & Windus, .
A Hundred Years at Waddesdon (1998), .
Life in the French Country House (2000)
Rushton Triangular Lodge (2004)
Elizabethan Architecture: Its Rise and Fall, 1540–1640 (2009), .
Enthusiasms (2011) Frances Lincoln, 
Friendships (2017)

References

External links

  – list of books published
 Photo and Elizabethan Architecture book profile

1931 births
2022 deaths
Alumni of Christ Church, Oxford
British people of Jewish descent
British writers
British architectural historians
Country Life (magazine) people
Fellows of the Royal Society of Literature
Fellows of the Society of Antiquaries of London
People educated at Ampleforth College
Slade Professors of Fine Art (University of Oxford)